"Baby Got Back" is a song written and recorded by American rapper and songwriter Sir Mix-a-Lot, released in May 1992 as the second single from his third album, Mack Daddy (1992). The song was written and co-produced by him, and samples the 1986 Detroit techno single "Technicolor" by Channel One. It debuted at number 75 on the US Billboard Hot 100 on April 11, 1992 and hit number one twelve weeks later. The single spent five weeks at the top of the chart. At the time of its original release, the song caused controversy with its outspoken and blatantly sexual lyrics about women, as well as specific references to the female buttocks, which some people found objectionable. The song's accompanying music video was briefly banned by MTV.

"Baby Got Back" was the second best-selling song in the US in 1992, behind Boyz II Men's "End of the Road". In 2008, it was ranked number 17 on VH1's "100 Greatest Songs of Hip Hop".

Synopsis

The first verse begins with "I like big butts and I cannot lie" and most of the song is about the rapper's attraction to women with large buttocks. The second and third verse challenge mainstream norms of beauty: "I ain't talkin' 'bout Playboy. Cause silicone parts are made for toys." and "So Cosmo says you're fat. Well I ain't down with that!"

The song came from a meeting between Sir Mix-a-Lot and Amylia Dorsey, who saw little representation of full-figured women in media. The idea came from a 1980s-era Budweiser commercial featuring very thin, Valley girl-esque models with different skin colors. They decided to dedicate a song to the opposite extreme, featuring curvy women of color. Mix and Dorsey sought to "broaden the definition of beauty."

Sir Mix-a-Lot commented in a 1992 interview: "The song doesn't just say I like large butts, you know? The song is talking about women who damn near kill themselves to try to look like these beanpole models that you see in Vogue magazine." He explains that most women respond positively to the song's message, especially black women: "They all say, 'About time.'"

In the song's prelude there is a conversation between two (presumably) thin, white Valley girls, similar to girl talk in Frank Zappa's "Valley Girl". One girl (dubbed Linda by Amylia Dorsey) remarks to her friend, "Oh, my, God Becky, look at her butt! It is so big... She's just so black!", at which point Sir Mix-a-Lot begins rapping.

The dialogue of actress Papillon Soo Soo saying "Me so horny" is sampled from the 1987 film Full Metal Jacket to complete Sir Mix-a-Lot's lyric, "That butt you got makes..."

In 2014, according to TMZ, Sir Mix-a-Lot says it was Jennifer Lopez's moves as a Fly Girl on the 90s show In Living Color that first inspired him to write "Baby Got Back".

Critical reception
Larry Flick from Billboard wrote, "First offering from rapper's major-label debut, Mack Daddy, cheekily rhapsodizes about the joys of women with prominent backsides. Cute rhymes and slammin' beats add up to a potential smash at several formats." J.D. Considine from The Baltimore Sun commented, "In some cases, what's said can be as simple as Sir Mix-a-Lot's assertion 'I like big butts!' in the single 'Baby Got Back'. On the surface, it may seem that all he's doing is expressing an opinion, but there's more to it than Mix-a-Lot's personal preferences. At root, 'Baby Got Back' challenges the dominant standard for physical beauty in our culture, a standard that stresses long legs, slim hips, small buttocks and has no room for women with wide hips or protuberant posteriors. And the fact that 'Baby Got Back' spent five weeks at No. 1 suggests that there are millions who agree with his assessment." James Bernard from Entertainment Weekly remarked that the song "alternates deftly between a critique of the Cosmo/Playboy narrow-minded — and narrow-hipped — standard of female beauty and a bawdy appreciation of, er, generous rear ends." In Melody Maker'''s review of the album, "Baby Got Back" was named "worst of all" and "a hip hop "Fatty Bum Bum" and - Warning! Warning! - could be a novelty hit." Mark Coleman from Rolling Stone said the song "celebrates a section of the anatomy long revered by rappers ("beggin' for a piece of that bubble" is a new twist)."

In 2020, Cleveland.com ranked "Baby Got Back" number 24 in their list of the best Billboard  Hot 100 No. 1 song of the 1990s. They described it as "the novelty song that never went away", adding, "You could put this on at a wedding today and women will recite the opening word for word before the rap breaks in and everyone (and I mean everyone) joins in. Sir Mix-a-Lot was never shy about playing up the song's "playful" nature, rapping on top of a giant butt in the video." The song has been cited as a limitations of Bechdel test. It has been described as passing the test because it begins with a valley girl saying to another "oh my god, Becky, look at her butt".This Bechdel Test Simulator Shows How Easy It Is to Predict Who Makes Sexist Movies (Men) , by Kara Brown, at Jezebel; published January 15, 2016; retrieved April 17, 2018

Chart performance and awards
"Baby Got Back" reached number one on the US Billboard Hot 100 chart for five weeks in the summer of 1992, and won a 1993 Grammy Award for Best Rap Solo Performance. In the years following the song's release on the album Mack Daddy, it has continued to appear in many movies, television shows, and commercials, as detailed below. It was ranked number six on VH1's "Greatest Songs of the '90s", and number one on VH1's "Greatest One Hit Wonders of the '90s".

Track listing

Charts

Weekly charts

Year-end charts

Decade-end charts

All-time charts

Certifications

In popular culture
In the third-season episode "Chirlaxx" of the stop-motion animated sketch comedy series Robot Chicken, Sir Mix-a-Lot guest starred as himself in a sketch titled "Table Be Round", which sees him performing the titular song - a parody of "Baby Got Back" - for King Arthur and the Knights of the Round Table, as response to their difficulty of communication with one another when seated at their elongated table, also replacing it with the Round Table.

In the comedy film American Pie Presents: Band Camp, this song is part of its soundtrack.

In the 1993 Joel Schumacher film Falling Down, a giant inflatable butt promoting the single is visible in a scene where D-Fens (Michael Douglas) destroys a pay phone booth with a submachine gun.

In the 1999 Futurama episode A Fishful of Dollars, Fry plays the song on an 'antique' stereo until Leela shuts it off, referring to it as 'classical music'.

In the 2002 Friends episode The One with Ross's Inappropriate Song, Ross was singing the song to his baby daughter Emma, which made her laugh for the first time.

The song briefly plays in the 2004 animated film Shark Tale when Don Lino's octopus assistant Luca adjusts the needle on the phonograph, leading to the aforementioned song being played.

The song plays during the credit sequence of the 2009 video game Fat Princess while the player is attacking the staff with a scythe.

In 2019, former governor of Alaska and Republican vice-presidential candidate Sarah Palin performed the song on Fox's The Masked Singer while dressed as a bear.

Jonathan Coulton cover/Glee cover 

Jonathan Coulton released a cover of "Baby Got Back" during his Thing a Week project in October 2005, with the song being released as part of the first Thing A Week compilation album the next year.

In late January 2013, a preview of the television show Glee included a cover of "Baby Got Back" that would be part of an upcoming episode. Coulton and others noted that the backing music was at least extremely similar to his recorded version—and possibly used his original musical composition or even the audio track. Coulton reported that the Fox Broadcasting Network had not asked him about using the recording, nor responded to his inquiries before the episode aired. The episode, "Sadie Hawkins", aired unchanged on January 24, 2013; further analysis of the aired version showed the Glee cover appeared to use Coulton's original musical arrangement; it included Coulton's original melody and a changed line in Coulton's version ("Johnny C's in trouble" instead of the original "Mix-a-Lot's in trouble"). Fox officials later contacted agents for Coulton, claiming, in his words, "they're within their legal rights to do this, and that [Coulton] should be happy for the exposure", even though Coulton is not credited within the episode. Coulton has been exploring legal options; while musical covers do not have copyright legal protection in the United States, Coulton may have legal rights if the Glee version is found to have used his audio track or original composition directly. Coulton has since released his cover of "Baby Got Back" to iTunes, what he calls "a cover of Glee's cover of my cover of Sir Mix-a-Lot's song", with proceeds going to charity. Coulton's experience led other artists who believe that Glee used their cover arrangements as backing within the show to step forward with similar claims.

Related songs
In a 2000 interview, Sir Mix-a-Lot reflected, "There's always butt songs. Hell, I got the idea sitting up here listening to old Parliament records: Motor Booty Affair. Black men like butts. That's the bottom line." The song is part of a tradition of 1970s–90s African-American music celebrating the female posterior, including "Da Butt", "Rump Shaker", and "Shake Your Groove Thing".

In 2014, Trinidadian-American rapper Nicki Minaj sampled the basis and some verses of "Baby Got Back" for her hit "Anaconda", from the album The Pinkprint''. The song has been viewed by some as a diss track, in answer to "Baby Got Back". Whereas Sir Mix-a-Lot focuses on a woman's body and the pleasure it gives him, Minaj raps from the perspective of the unnamed woman, and shows how she uses her callipygian physique to profit and empower herself.

See also
 1992 in music
 Hot 100 number-one hits of 1992 (USA)
 Cultural history of the buttocks

References

Further reading

1992 songs
1992 singles
Sir Mix-a-Lot songs
Billboard Hot 100 number-one singles
Body image in popular culture
Grammy Award for Best Rap Solo Performance
Song recordings produced by Rick Rubin
Dirty rap songs
American Recordings (record label) singles
Reprise Records singles
Obscenity controversies in music
Songs written by Sir Mix-a-Lot